Rene Ricard (July 23, 1946 – February 1, 2014) was an American poet, actor, art critic, and painter.

Life and career
Albert Napoleon Ricard was born in Boston and grew up in Acushnet, Massachusetts, near New Bedford. As a young teenager he ran away to Boston and assimilated into the literary scene of the city. By age eighteen, he had moved to New York City, where he became a protégé of Andy Warhol. He appeared in the Warhol films Kitchen (1965), Chelsea Girls (1966), and The Andy Warhol Story (1966).

As a performer, Ricard was a founding participant in the Theater of the Ridiculous collaborating with John Vaccaro and Charles Ludlam. He also appeared in the 1980 Eric Mitchell independent film Underground U.S.A. (1980), as well as numerous other independent art and commercial films.

In the 1980s, he wrote a series of influential essays for Artforum magazine. Having achieved stature in the art world by successfully launching the career of painter Julian Schnabel, Ricard helped bring Jean-Michel Basquiat to fame. In December 1981, he published the first major article on Basquiat, entitled "The Radiant Child," in Artforum.

Ricard also contributed art essays to numerous gallery and exhibition catalogs. He was immortalized by Jean-Michel Basquiat in the drawing entitled Untitled (Axe/Rene), representing the tension that existed between the two.

Warhol called Ricard "the George Sanders of the Lower East Side, the Rex Reed of the art world." From the mid-1960s Ricard contributed writings to numerous independent poetry magazines and anthologies. In 1979, the Dia Art Foundation published Ricard's first book of poems, an eponymous volume styled on Tiffany & Co. catalog. The fact that the turquoise-covered book of poems appears in photographs taken on the beach in The Ballad of Sexual Dependency by Nan Goldin illustrates its ubiquity as summer reading in 1979.

His second book of poetry, God With Revolver (Hanuman Books) was published ten years later, edited by Raymond Foye. The same year he contributed poems to Francesco Clemente: Sixteen Pastels (London: Anthony D'Offay). Ricard released two other volumes of poetry: Trusty Sarcophagus Co. (Inanout Press, 1990), which featured his poems rendered in paintings and drawings and was the basis of an exhibit at the Petersburg Gallery, New York City; and Love Poems (C U Z Editions, 1999) as a collaboration with artist Robert Hawkins who provided drawings for the book. Ricard also saw publication of single-poem works as limited edition artist books: Opera of the Worms with paintings by Judith Rifka (1984), Cecil (2004), and In Daddy's Hand with artist Rita Barros (2010).

Beginning in the late 1980s Ricard's poems were often rendered in paintings and drawings. His work was the subject of several solo gallery exhibitions in the United States and United Kingdom, as well as being represented in many group exhibitions. In 2003, Percival Press published the full-color monograph Paintings & Drawings, illustrating a collection of visually rendered poems by Ricard. In 2004, Ricard created the album cover for Shadows Collide With People by musician John Frusciante.

Ricard was portrayed by Michael Wincott in Julian Schnabel's biographical film, Basquiat (1996). He lived at the famed Hotel Chelsea in New York City intermittently for 40 years.

Death
Ricard died on February 1, 2014, of cancer at Bellevue Hospital in New York City at the age of 67.

Books

Art reviews and essays

Selected additional published works

Solo exhibitions

Film performances

Recordings

References

External links

"After The Fall", Michele Civetta, NYU TSOA

1946 births
American male actors
American male poets
American gay writers
American LGBT poets
LGBT people from Massachusetts
2014 deaths
People from Acushnet, Massachusetts
Writers from Boston
Writers from New York City
20th-century American poets
20th-century American male writers
Deaths from cancer in New York (state)
Gay poets